The 2015–16 Championnat National season was the 18th season since its establishment. The previous season's champions were Red Star.

Teams

Stadia and locations

 1 Bastia failed to reach an agreement with the local government on the use of Stade Armand Cesari, the local professional stadium. As a result, they will play in their smaller original stadium, Stade d'Erbajolo, after a minor renovation. During this renovation, the team will play its home games in Stade Claude-Papi in Porto-Vecchio, after playing its first two home games at Stade Charles-Ehrmann in Nice, and Stade Jean-Filippi in Vescovato.

League table

Results

Top goalscorers

Source: Scoresway

References

External links 
 

2015-16
3
Fra